Noah Sonko Sundberg (born 6 June 1996) is a professional footballer who plays as a defender for Bulgarian First League club Levski Sofia. A former youth international for Sweden, he plays for the Gambia national team.

Club career
Born to a Gambian mother and a Swedish father, Sonko Sundberg joined AIK as a youth player in early 2010. In the summer of 2013 he was moved up to the first team where he made his first team debut in a friendly against Manchester United. On 2 June 2014 he made his Allsvenskan debut at home against IF Brommapojkarna.

He was loaned out to fellow Allsvenskan club GIF Sundsvall in both 2016 and 2017, being an important member of their squad beside fellow central defender Marcus Danielsson.

On 9 January 2018, Sonko Sundberg transferred to Östersunds FK on a permanent deal from AIK, signing a four year-deal with his new club.

On 4 November 2021, Sonko Sundberg signed a 2,5-year deal with Bulgarian club Levski Sofia, which came into effect on 1 January 2022, once his contract with Östersunds had ended.

International career
In September 2013, Sonko Sundberg was selected to the Sweden national under-17 football team that would compete in the 2013 FIFA U-17 World Cup. On 2 October 2020, he was called up by the senior Gambia national team. He debuted with Gambia in a friendly 1-0 win over Congo on 9 October 2020.

Club statistics

Honours
Sweden U17
 FIFA U-17 World Cup third place: 2013
Levski Sofia
 Bulgarian Cup: 2021–22

References

External links
 
 Eliteprospects profile
 AIK profile
 

1996 births
Living people
People with acquired Gambian citizenship
Gambian footballers
The Gambia international footballers
Swedish footballers
Sweden youth international footballers
Gambian people of Swedish descent
Swedish people of Gambian descent
Association football defenders
AIK Fotboll players
GIF Sundsvall players
Allsvenskan players
PFC Levski Sofia players
Footballers at the 2016 Summer Olympics
Olympic footballers of Sweden
Enskede IK players
First Professional Football League (Bulgaria) players
2021 Africa Cup of Nations players
Östersunds FK players
Sweden under-21 international footballers
Footballers from Stockholm